The furred sponge crab, Pseudodromia latens, is a species of crab in the family Dromiidae, often referred to as sponge crabs.

Description
It may be yellow or cream and has knobbly tips to its legs, It carries a cloak of sponge or ascidians on its back, probably for camouflage.

Distribution
This crab is found from the Namibian border and around the South African coast to Sodwana Bay subtidally and to at least 18 m underwater. It is also found in the Indian Ocean.

Ecology
This crab cuts a piece of sponge or ascidian from a colony and holds it on its back using its fifth pair of legs which are specially bent upwards for this purpose. The crab gains protection in the form of camouflage and the deterrent provided by the toxins of the animals it carries. The covering grows to almost completely cover the crab.

References

Dromiacea
Crustaceans of South Africa
Crustaceans of the Atlantic Ocean
Crustaceans of the Indian Ocean
Crustaceans described in 1858
Taxa named by William Stimpson